Charles d'Orléans may refer to:

Charles, Duke of Orléans (1394–1465), son of Louis I, Duke of Orléans and Valentina Visconti
Charles II de Valois, Duke of Orléans (1522–1545), son of King Francis I of France
Charles d'Orléans de Rothelin (1691–1744), French churchman and scholar
Charles d'Orléans, Duke of Penthièvre, Duke of Penthièvre (1820–1828) son of Louis Philippe, Duke of Orléans and Maria Amalia of Naples
Prince Charles-Philippe, Duke of Anjou (born 1973), son of Prince Michel, Count of Évreux